A pre-school playgroup, or in everyday usage just a playgroup, is an organised group providing care and socialisation for children under five. The term is widely used in the United Kingdom. Playgroups are less formal than the preschool education of nursery schools. They do not provide full-time care, operating for only a few hours a day during school term time, often in the mornings only. They are staffed by nursery nurses or volunteers, not by nursery teachers, and are run by private individuals or charities, rather than by the state or companies.

In the United Kingdom, since around the 1980s, the traditional territory of the playgroup has been encroached on by the expansion of more formal nursery education, and playgroups often now cater only for two- and three-year-olds before they move onto a nursery school. Over the same period there has been an increase in the state supervision of playgroups.

Playgroups in the United States
In the United States, a playgroup is an organization of parents with the expressed intent to have the children come together and play. There are playgroups that cater to specific categories of parents, particularly including stay at home dads, stay at home moms, and working moms. In areas of the US where homeschooling is popular, it is not unusual to see groups specifically for homeschooling families. These can be part of localized or even national playgroups. Churches, rec centers, and other community organizations sometimes sponsor weekly or monthly playgroups. Age limits are determined by the individual group. Some groups have upper age limits and some do not. It is not unusual to see groups where, in addition to activities for the children, there are social events for the whole family or for parents only. In highly mobile communities, playgroups can be an important tool for building the social networks of young families who have recently relocated to the area. There are a number of resources online for parents to find playgroups in their area - including Playgroups USA and Social Toddler - both directories and social networks for parents in playgroups.

International Playgroups in the Netherlands

In The Netherlands, international or expatriate parents form small groups, local to their area, for the purpose of providing a play space for babies and toddlers up to the age of 4-5, as well as offering a support network for the parents themselves. Meetings are usually held weekly in a hall or other public venue, and the groups usually organize other social activities such as Ladies Nights Out, visits to local parks and zoos, summer barbecues etc. In Maastricht, for example, the Maastricht International Playgroup  was established more than 10 years ago as a way to cater to the needs of expatriate families living in and around the area.

Another International Playgroup is First Friends in Voorhout (in the Leiden area).

Playgroups in Australia
Playgroup Australia is the national peak and administrative body for playgroups in Australia. Playgroup is an informal session where mums, dads, grand parents, caregivers, children and babies meet together in a relaxed environment.

Playgroups are set up and run by parents and caregivers, with children choosing from a range of activities set up to meet their varying needs. Activities at playgroup are either free or low cost, and may include music and singing, imaginative play,
outdoor and free play, art and craft activities or outings.

Playgroups can be held anywhere that is safe for children and where groups of people can meet – community and neighbourhood centres, health clinics, women's centres, preschools and kindergartens, church halls and even in someone's house. In a playgroup, parents and caregivers stay to interact with the other adults and to play with the children. No child is too young for playgroup. All children from 0–5 years, including babies, love new experiences and benefit from developing sensory, social and communication skills through activities at playgroup.

March 2003 saw a dramatic increase in the number of mothers attending playgroup.

Playgroups in Hong Kong
In Hong Kong, pre-school children (0 – 3 years) join playgroups to study (mostly foreign languages) in an interactive environment before they go on to kindergartens.

Playgroups in Philippines 
In the Philippines, typical playgroup activity centers can be usually seen in malls where parents can leave their children for a few minutes to a few hours in an interactive environment where they can play and learn together with random group of children. There are also toddler playgroup class in several schools which offers a combination of Family Music, story telling, sensory activities, simple puzzles, match and sorting activities.

References

External links 
 Pre-school Learning Alliance (UK)

Early childhood education
Education in the United Kingdom
Family
School types